The Essential Kenny G is the fifth greatest hits album by saxophonist Kenny G, released by Arista Records in 2006. It reached number 3 on the Billboard Contemporary Jazz chart. Two different editions of the album were released: the single-disc version contains fifteen songs, while the double-disc edition has 31 songs.

Track listing

Single-disc version
"What A Wonderful World" (with Louis Armstrong) – 3:01
"Morning" – 5:15
"Sister Rose" – 6:13
"Even If My Heart Would Break" (featuring Aaron Neville) – 4:59
"The Moment" – 6:01
"Summertime" (featuring George Benson) – 6:44
"Missing You Now" (with Michael Bolton) – 4:33
"G-Bop" – 4:06
"My Heart Will Go On" – 4:22
"Beautiful" (featuring Chaka Khan) – 3:45
"Havana" – 7:22
"Going Home" – 5:30
"Januari" (featuring Glenn Fredly) – 3:51
"The Way You Move" (featuring Earth, Wind & Fire) – 4:09
"Jasmine Flower" – 4:36

Double-disc version

Disc 1
"Songbird" – 5:03
"Sade" – 4:20
"Slip of the Tongue" – 4:53
"Don't Make Me Wait for Love" – 4:03
"Silhouette" – 5:29
"Against Doctor's Orders" – 4:44
"What Does It Take (To Win Your Love)" – 4:08
"Brazil" – 4:38
"Theme from Dying Young" – 4:01
"We've Saved the Best for Last" – 4:20
"Forever in Love" – 4:59
"Midnight Motion (Live)" – 8:23
"By the Time This Night Is Over" (featuring Peabo Bryson) – 4:24
"Loving You" – 3:20
"Have Yourself a Merry Little Christmas" – 3:58
"Sentimental" – 6:35
"De Mil Colores" (featuring Rosario Flores) - 3:59 (Bonus track)

Disc 2
"What a Wonderful World" (with Louis Armstrong) – 3:01
"Morning" – 5:14
"Sister Rose" – 6:14
"Even if My Heart Would Break" – 5:00
"The Moment" – 6:03
"Summertime" (featuring George Benson) – 6:46
"Missing You Now" (with Michael Bolton) – 4:35
"Pick Up the Pieces" (featuring David Sanborn) – 4:15
"My Heart Will Go On" – 4:23
"Beautiful" (featuring Chaka Khan) – 3:46
"Havana" – 7:23
"Going Home" – 5:32
"The Way You Move" (featuring Earth, Wind & Fire) – 4:10
"Deck the Halls / The Twelve Days of Christmas" – 3:00
"Auld Lang Syne (The Millennium Mix)" – 7:52

References

Albums produced by Walter Afanasieff
Kenny G compilation albums
2006 greatest hits albums
Arista Records compilation albums